The Menominee Indians are a nation of Native Americans.

Menominee can also refer to:

Menominee language, their language
College of Menominee Nation, a community college that the tribe founded
Menominee Indian Reservation, Wisconsin

Municipalities and administrative divisions
 Menominee, Illinois, a village
 Menominee Township, Jo Daviess County, Illinois
 Menominee, Michigan
 Menominee Township, Michigan
 Menominee County, Michigan
 Menominee, Nebraska
 Menominee, Wisconsin, a town
 Menominee County, Wisconsin

Land features
Little Menominee River in Wisconsin and Illinois
Menominee River in Michigan and Wisconsin
Menominee River (Illinois)

Other
Chief Menominee (c. 1791 – 1841) of the Potawatomi
Round whitefish, called menominees in parts of the northern Great Lakes

See also
Menomonee (disambiguation)
Menomonie (disambiguation)